Caspase-10 (FLICE2, Mch4, CASP-10, ICE-like apoptotic protease 4, apoptotic protease Mch-4, FAS-associated death domain protein interleukin-1beta-converting enzyme 2) is an enzyme. This enzyme catalyses the following chemical reaction

 Strict requirement for Asp at position P1 and has a preferred cleavage sequence of Leu-Gln-Thr-Asp!Gly

Caspase-10 is an initiator caspase, as are caspase-2 (EC 3.4.22.55), caspase-8 (EC 3.4.22.61) and caspase-9 (EC 3.4.22.62).

References

External links 
 

EC 3.4.22